Ọmụgwọ  is an Igbo word of the South-Eastern Nigeria that describes the process of which a family member takes care of a new mother and her baby, in a short period of time after childbirth. Ọmụgwọ can be done during the first 40 days of a child's life or more. In most cases, it is the child's grandmother or grand step-mother that would stay during the period of ọmụgwọ. In their absence, the mother-in-law will replace the grandmother or grand step-mother. The importance of this practice is that it helps the new mother learn and be guided on the process of childcare through the experience of her mother or mother-in-law, it guides them on becoming a mother, by providing knowledge and support.

Igbo tradition
Igbos are the originators of the tradition that is now practiced in many parts of Nigeria. This custom provides special care for new and nursing mothers. Postpartum care is encouraged in Igbo culture because is important for a new mother to get enough rest so that she can regain her strength. Ọmụgwọ is one of the most important and ancient Igbo traditions.

How ọmụgwọ is done 

Often, after childbirth is when ọmụgwọ begins. It is the responsibility of the grandmother to educate or guide the new mother on the type of food she eats to help with the production of breast milk, the new mother will also be massaged with hot water regularly. 

After the baby is born, the grandmother will help the new mother to massage herself and her body. Hot water massage involves dipping a towel in hot water and using it massage the new mother's stomach. Sitz Bath is also an important practice for a newborn's mother if she had a vaginal delivery and has a perineum tear. Stting on hot water helps heal her internal organs properly. During this process, The mother or stepmother is involved in many household chores, caring for both the mother and the baby. The new mother will be given spicy foods such as pepper soup made with local spice to help remove unwanted blood clots from her body and help boost milk production. Akamu is also another feeding option for the mother as it helps to produce breast milk. Akamu is a local cereal made from grains like maize, sorghum, Guinea corn, etc.

At the end of ọmụgwọ, the grandmother is given gift to show appreciation from the new parents as she goes back to her own home. These gifts can be in the form of clothes, soap, food, money, and other material things.

References 

Igbo culture
Igbo society
 Tradition
 African culture